Helldorff is a surname. Notable people with the surname include:

 Otto von Helldorff (1833–1908), German politician, member of Reichtstag
 Wolf-Heinrich Graf von Helldorff (1896–1944), German politician, SA-Obergruppenführer, police official

Surnames of German origin